Vinicius Lazzer Poit (born 31 January 1986 in São Bernardo do Campo) is a Brazilian politician and entrepreneur. He has spent his political career representing São Paulo, having served as federal deputy representative since 2019.

Personal life
Poit is a graduate of Fundação Getúlio Vargas, and before being a politician worked as a businessperson coach to teach individuals how to be entrepreneur, and is the founder of Recruit Simple, an online platform for rapid recruitment.

Political career
Poit was elected to be federal deputy for the state of São Paulo, being elected with 207,118 votes.

References

External links
 
 
 
 

1986 births
Living people
People from São Bernardo do Campo
Brazilian businesspeople
New Party (Brazil) politicians
Members of the Chamber of Deputies (Brazil) from São Paulo
Members of the Legislative Assembly of São Paulo
21st-century Brazilian people